Lists of airlines cover existing and defunct airlines. Complete lists are given in alphabetical sequence by the name of the continent from which they operate. 
Lists are also given by size, by business model and by other characteristics.
There are over 5,000 airlines with ICAO codes. The world's largest airline by fleet size and passengers carried is American Airlines, operating from the United States.

By continent
Lists of airlines based on continent:
 List of airlines of Africa
 List of airlines of the Americas
 List of airlines of Asia
 List of airlines of Europe
 List of airlines of Oceania

By size and continent
List of largest airlines in the world
List of largest airlines in Africa
List of largest airlines in Asia
List of largest airlines in Central America & the Caribbean
List of largest airlines in Europe
List of largest airlines in North America
List of largest airlines in Oceania
List of largest airlines in South America

By business model
 List of government-owned airlines
 List of passenger airlines
 List of charter airlines
 List of low-cost airlines
 List of regional airlines

By other characteristics

 Flag carrier
 List of airlines by foundation date
 List of airlines with more than 100 destinations
 List of defunct airlines
 List of helicopter airlines
 List of airline codes
 List of government-owned airlines

References

External links 
 Searchable database of airlines

Airline
Airlines